Hassan Adhuham (born 8 January 1990) is a Maldivian footballer, who is currently playing for Club Eagles.

Career statistics

International goals

Under-23
Scores and results list Maldives U-23's goal tally first.

Senior team
Scores and results list Maldives's goal tally first.

External links
Shaafee and Adhuham to Maziya

References

1990 births
Living people
Maldivian footballers
Maldives international footballers
Victory Sports Club players
Association football midfielders
Association football forwards
Club Eagles players